Gröna Lund ("Green Grove"), or colloquially Grönan, is an amusement park in Stockholm, Sweden. Located on the seaward side of Djurgården Island, it is relatively small compared to other amusement parks, mainly because of its central location, which limits expansion. The  amusement park has over 30 attractions and is a popular venue for concerts in the summer. It was founded in 1883 by James Schultheiss.

History
Gröna Lund's roots are in the 1880s, making it Sweden's oldest amusement park. However the area has been used for similar purposes since the early 18th century. In 1883, a German by the name of Jacob Schultheiss rented the area to erect "carousels and other amusements". Until 2001, descendants of Schultheiss ran Gröna Lund. Before the amusement park came into being, Gröna Lund was the name of a small park.

The park's location is unique in the sense that most of the buildings are old residential and commercial structures from the 19th century. The buildings were not built for the park; instead, the park was built around the buildings. The park has three different entertainment venues: Dansbanan (Lilla Scenen), Gröna Lundsteatern and Stora Scenen.

Gröna Lund features most attractions common to amusement parks, such as a tunnel of love, a funhouse and eight roller coasters. Gröna Lund is also known for its rock and pop music concerts; the capacity record is held by Bob Marley, who attracted 32,000 people in 1980; it was his third performance at the venue, after stints in 1977 and 1978. The record is unbeatable since new regulations prevent such large audiences at Gröna Lund. American rapper Nas performed with almost 22,000 people in 2010.

The park is easily accessible by tram #7, bus #67 and by ferry from the city centre. Its central location allows visitors to view large parts of Stockholm from the taller attractions.

Since 2006, the park is owned by Parks & Resorts Scandinavia AB, which is wholly owned by the Tidstrand family, which also owns Kolmården Zoo and Skara Sommarland.

Rides

Roller coasters

Other rides 
 Eclipse - 121.9 m tall swing ride, opened in 2013, height limit 1.2 m. Funtime.
 Blue Train - dark ride that opened in 1935, refurbished in 1982 and again in 2011. Magnus Sörman, Gosetto (2011 refurbishments).
 Chain Flyer - wave swinger, opened in 1997, height limit 1.1 m. Zierer.
 Extreme - top scan, opened in 1999, moved in 2013, height limit 1.4 m. Mondial.
 Flying Carpet - carpet ride, opened in 1983; height limit 1.2 m. Zierer.
 Fritt Fall Tilt - 80 m tall tilting drop tower, opened in 1998, the "tilt " function introduced in 2004, height limit 1.4 m. Intamin.
 House of Nightmares - spooky haunted house, opened in 2015. Sally Corporation.
 Katapulten - 55 m tall launch tower; height limit 1,4m. S&S Worldwide.
 Kärlekstunneln - Old Mill (ride)
 Lantern - spinning tower ride, opened in 2008, height limit 1.1 m. Zierer.
 Octopus - octopus spinner, opened in 2000, height limit 1.1 m. Anton Schwarzkopf.
 Pop Expressen - breakdance spinner, opened in 1996; height limit 1.4 m. Huss.
 Radiobilen - bumper cars, opened in 1968, height limit 1.2 m. Reverchon.
 Rock Jet - rotator, opened in 1976, height limit none /1.1 m alone. Reverchon
 Snake - Chaos Pendel, opened in 2019 and given away to Skara Sommarland in 2020, height limit 1.4 m. Funtime
 Ikaros - 95 m tall tilting tower opened in 2017, Known as a "Sky Jump" similar to Falcon's Fury at Busch Gardens Tampa. Intamin.

Kiddie rides 
 Circus Carousel - merry go round, opened in 1883.
 Flying Elephants - fly the elephants ride, opened in 1983. Zamperla.
 Fun House - indoor obstacle house, opened in 1883. Gröna Lund, rebuilt in 1986 by Zierer
 Kuling - rocking tug, opened in 2005. Zamperla.
 Little Paris Wheel - mini Ferris wheel, opened in 1993. Zamperla.
 Mini Bumper Cars - kiddie bumper cars, opened in 2003. Bertazzon.
 Mirror House - classic mirror maze, opened in 1935.
 Pettson and Findus World - walkthrough and play area, opened in 2003. Gröna Lund.
 Tea Cups - spinning tea cups, opened in 2008. Mack Rides.
 Tunnel of Love - classic dark ride for kids, opened in 1917 and refurbished in 1986. Gröna Lund
 Veteran Cars - on track cars.
 Arcade Games - arcade games and test-your-skill games.

Special events 
The park hosts various special events throughout the season, particularly music concerts. Famous musicians that have performed at Grona Lund include: T.Rex (band) in '77, Bob Marley and the Wailers in '78 and '80, ABBA in '73, Europe in '84, The Cardigans in '97, Robyn in '99, Caesars in '02, Dr. Alban in '03, A*Teens in '03, Icona Pop in '13, Tove Lo in '14, Meshuggah in '14, "Weird Al" Yankovic and Basshunter in '15, Deep Purple in '16, Ghost in '17, Zara Larsson in '17 and '22, Gojira in '19, Sting in '19 and Dua Lipa in '22.

Gallery

See also
Liseberg 
Skansen
Djurgården line

References

External links

Gröna Lund official site
Parks & Resorts Scandinavia AB
Panoramic virtual tour of entrance to Grona Lund

 
Amusement parks in Sweden
Djurgården
Tourist attractions in Stockholm
Parks in Stockholm
1883 establishments in Sweden
Amusement parks opened in 1883